Earthquakes in Peru are common occurrences as the country is located in a seismic zone. The interface between the Nazca and South American tectonic plates is located near the Peruvian coast.

This earthquakes occur as thrust faulting on the interface between the two plates, with the South American Plate moving towards the sea over the Nazca Plate. The same process has caused the rise of the Andes mountain range and the creation of the Peru–Chile Trench, as well as volcanism in the Peruvian highlands.

Geology of Peru
The oldest rocks in Peru date to the Precambrian and are more than two billion years old. Along the southern coast, granulite and charnockite shows reworking by an ancient orogeny mountain-building event. Situated close to the Peru-Chile Trench, these rocks have anomalously high strontium isotope ratios, which suggest recent calc-alkaline volcanism.

In the Eastern Cordillera of Peru, Precambrian magmatism in the Huanaco region produced ultramafic, mafic and felsic rocks, including serpentinite, meta-diorite, meta-gabbro, meta-tonalite and diorite and granite that intruded after the first phase of orogenic tectonic activity.

The Grenville orogeny had a major impact in Peru. The basement of the Central Andean orogeny includes the rocks of the Arequipa Massif, which reach granulite grade on the sequence of metamorphic facies and formed around 1.9 billion years ago. Zircon grains in these rocks match those in Labrador, Greenland and Scotland, indicating that much of western South America originated as a promontory of the proto-North American continent Laurentia.

Earthquakes
Notable earthquakes in Peruvian history include the following:

See also 
 Geography of Peru

Sources

External links
 Historic Worldwide Earthquakes
 Historic Peru Earthquakes

 List
Peru
Earthquakes
Earthquakes